Group Shot is a photo combining program developed by Microsoft Research. Its purpose is to solve the problem of individuals in group photographs that might be doing undesirable things such as looking elsewhere, closing their eyes, not smiling, etc. The principle of Group Shot is that multiple group photographs will be taken in each session. Multiple images from a session are loaded into the application, and then the user selects the best parts from all of the different photos and merges them into one.

It was announced in Bill Gates' keynote at the 2007 Consumer Electronics Show. For a time, the software was available to download for Windows XP users, however it was later removed from the Microsoft Research website, and the project was officially closed. Microsoft Research stated that the beta period has expired.

The Group Shot engine was eventually included in Windows Live Photo Gallery Wave 4 under the name of Photo Fuse.

A similar feature is available in Adobe Photoshop Elements 6.0 under the name 'Photomerge Group Shot'. Essentially the same functionality is also available in Adobe Photoshop CS3's Photomerge, though not packaged as a separate feature. It is available as well in the open-source application Hugin and the Samsung Galaxy Camera.

In January 2012, a GroupShot mobile app was released by Macadamia Apps allowing users to create a group image from multiple similar images on their mobile phone. The app is available for download in the iTunes App Store.

In April 2016, DEVART, the Netherlands introduced  a mobile app for iPhone called Snaptric that uses a new hi-tech seam technique enabling users to replace faces in a set of group photos with the same background and people. It does not simply replace the face but makes a nice seam through the original and replacement photos so that the new face blends seamlessly with the background. Users can preview their result in real time, without hassle with layers and traditional Photo-editor procedures.

References

External links
Group Shot on Microsoft Research site
Paul Thurrott's SuperSite for Windows: Windows Ultimate Extras Review
Download Mirror

Photo software
Windows graphics-related software